In mathematics, a Wall polynomial is a polynomial studied by  in his work on conjugacy classes in classical groups, and named by .

References

Polynomials